Unwound is the fourth studio album by the American post-hardcore band Unwound. The album was originally intended to be their debut, but was eventually pushed back three years later. Trouser Press called the album "one of their best".

Background and Recording
Recorded in May 1992, Unwound wasn't released until August 1995, at which point Unwound had already recorded and released three other albums on Kill Rock Stars. "Kandy Korn Rituals" and "Against" (the latter of which is unlisted and attached to "Kandy Korn Rituals" on this album) were previously released on a 7" by Kill Rock Stars in 1992, along with a live song called "Hating in D".  "You Bite My Tongue", "Understand & Forget" and "Kid Is Gone" were released as a self-titled 7" by Gravity Records in 1993.  The other songs on this album were previously unreleased.  Drummer Brandt Sandeno quit before the mixing was completed, thus the album was shelved until 1995 when the band decided "it was good" and finished the mixing. The vinyl version was released on Vern Rumsey's Punk In My Vitamins label.

The album became out-of-print for many years until it was reissued in the vinyl boxset Kid Is Gone in 2013.

Track listing

Personnel
 Justin Trosper - Vocals, Guitar
 Vern Rumsey - Bass
 Brandt Sandeno - Drums
 Jane Laughlin - Photography
 Steve Fisk - Recording, mixing
 Stuart Hallerman - Recording

References

Unwound albums
1995 albums
Albums produced by Steve Fisk